TSBV is the acronym for tryptic soy-serum-bacitracin-vancomycin, a type of agar plate medium used in microbiological testing to select for Aggregatibacter actinomycetemcomitans (A.a.).  It was described by Jørgen Slots in 1982, who also discovered the role of A.a. in periodontitis.

Per liter, TSBV contains:
 40 g tryptic soy agar
 1 g yeast extract
 100 mL horse serum
 75 mg bacitracin
 5 mg vancomycin

References

Microbiology